The 1992–93 National Hurling League, known for sponsorship reasons as the Royal Liver Assurance National Hurling League, was the 62nd staging of the National Hurling League. Cork won the league, beating Wexford by 3-11 to 1-12 after two replays of the final.

Format
There are 12 teams in Division 1, divided into two groups. There are 8 teams in Division 2. Each team plays all the teams in its group once, earning 2 points for a win and 1 for a draw.

Eight teams progress to the NHL quarter-finals:
The top three in Division 1A
The top three in Division 1B
The top two in Division 2

Division 1

Limerick came into the season as defending champions of the 1991-92 season.

On 22 May 1993, Cork won the title following a 3-11 to 1-12 win over Wexford in the final. It was their first league title since 1980-81 and their 13th National League title overall.

Cork's Barry Egan was the Division 1 top scorer.

Division 1A table

Limerick are placed third after winning playoff.

Group stage

Division 1B table

Cork are placed third after winning playoffs.

Group stage

Play-offs

Knock-out stage

BracketQuarter-finals

Semi-finals

Finals

Scoring statistics

Top scorers overall

Top scorers in a single game

Division 2

Division 2 table

Division 3

Division 3A table

Division 3B table

Knock-out stage

Finals

External links
 1992–93 National Hurling League results

References

National Hurling League seasons
League
League